Jacco Eltingh and Paul Haarhuis were the defending champions, but lost in the quarterfinals this year.

Todd Woodbridge and Mark Woodforde won the title, defeating Jim Grabb and Patrick McEnroe 6–3, 7–6 in the final.

Seeds

Draw

Finals

Top half

Section 1

Section 2

Bottom half

Section 3

Section 4

References

 Main Draw

Men's Doubles
1995 ATP Tour